Pseudochromis fuligifinis, the soot-tail dottyback, is a species of ray-finned fish from the Philippines in the Indo-Pacific, which is a member of the family Pseudochromidae.

References

fuligifinis
Taxa named by Anthony C. Gill
Taxa named by Jeffrey T. Williams
Fish described in 2011